Le Roy is a city in Decatur County, Iowa, United States. The population was 11 in the 2020 census, a decrease from 13 in 2000.

In the 2000 census, Le Roy had the distinction of being the second smallest populated incorporated city in Iowa. With the increase in the 2010 census of both Le Roy and Beaconsfield (population 11 in 2000), they now share the title of being the smallest populated incorporated cities in Iowa.

History
Le Roy got its start in 1880, following construction of the Humeston and Shenandoah Railroad through the territory. The city is named for Leroy Buffman, an early settler.

Geography
Le Roy's longitude and latitude are 40.877538, -93.593002.

Demographics

2010 census
As of the census of 2010, there were 15 people, 8 households, and 3 families residing in the city. The racial makeup of the city was 93.3% White and 6.7% from two or more races.

There were 8 households, of which 12.5% had children under the age of 18 living with them, 12.5% were married couples living together, 25.0% had a male householder with no wife present, and 62.5% were non-families. 50.0% of all households were made up of individuals, and 12.5% had someone living alone who was 65 years of age or older. The average household size was 1.88 and the average family size was 2.33.

The median age in the city was 56.3 years. 13.3% of residents were under the age of 18; 0.1% were between the ages of 18 and 24; 26.7% were from 25 to 44; 40% were from 45 to 64; and 20% were 65 years of age or older. The gender makeup of the city was 40.0% male and 60.0% female.

2000 census
As of the census of 2000, there were 13 people, 6 households, and 4 families residing in the city. The racial makeup of the city was 100.00% White.

There were 6 households, out of which 50.0% had children under the age of 18 living with them, 50.0% were married couples living together, 33.3% had a female householder with no husband present, and 16.7% were non-families. 16.7% of all households were made up of individuals, and none had someone living alone who was 65 years of age or older. The average household size was 2.17 and the average family size was 2.40.

In the city, the population was spread out, with 23.1% under the age of 18, 7.7% from 18 to 24, 53.8% from 45 to 64, and 15.4% who were 65 years of age or older. The median age was 50 years. For every 100 females, there were 62.5 males. For every 100 females age 18 and over, there were 66.7 males.

The median income for a household in the city was $33,125, and the median income for a family was $34,375. Males had a median income of $31,250 versus $0 for females. The per capita income for the city was $14,560. None of the population or families were below the poverty line.

Education
Mormon Trail Community School District operates schools serving the community.

References

External links

 
City-Data - comprehensive statistical data and more about Le Roy

Cities in Iowa
Cities in Decatur County, Iowa